The 2022 Indiana State Treasurer election took place on November 8, 2022, to elect the next Indiana State Treasurer. Incumbent Republican Party Treasurer Kelly Mitchell was term-limited and could not seek re-election.

Republican convention

Candidates

Nominee
Daniel Elliott, chair of the Morgan County Republican Party

Eliminated at convention
Lana Keesling, Fort Wayne city clerk
Elise Nieshalla, Boone County council president
Pete Seat, former Indiana Republican Party spokesman

Withdrew
Suzie Jaworowski, former chief of staff of the Office of Nuclear Energy (running for state representative)

Endorsements

Democratic convention

Candidates

Nominee
Jessica McClellan, Monroe County treasurer

General election

Results

References

External links
Official campaign websites
Dan Elliott (R) for State Treasurer
Jessica McClellan (D) for State Treasurer

State Treasurer
Indiana
Indiana State Treasurer elections